Haunted garden(s) may refer to:

Literature
 The Haunted Garden, a 1947 poetry collection by Henry Treece
 The Haunted Garden, a 1966 novel by Rosemary Timperley
 The Haunted Garden, a 1973 novel by W. E. D. Ross
 Haunted Gardens, a 2009 supernatural book by Peter Underwood

Other uses
 "The Haunted Garden", an episode of the television show Worlds Beyond
 Haunted Gardens, a 2019 album by Sadistik